Tania Sánchez Melero (born 29 April 1979) is a Spanish politician. She was United Left deputy in the Assembly of Madrid until she left that party on 4 February 2015.

Biography 
Tania Sánchez was born in Madrid in 1979. She has a three years degree in Social Education.

When a teenager she participated in several organizations related to the Punk subculture  and against the bullfights. She started her political life in the municipality of Rivas Vaciamadrid, where her family is strongly linked to the ruling United Left. In 2007 she was elected to the city council where she was the Deputy Spokesperson of the United Left municipal group, and designated to the Executive Board as has been Councillor-head of the Departments of Culture, Festivals and Cooperation for Development.

In the 2011 elections she was elected to the Madrid Assembly.

In 2012 Sanchez led one of the three lists that contended the 9th Regional Assembly of United Left of the Community of Madrid, coming third and obtaining 12% of the votes and 12 seats in the Regional Political Council. and was elected as member to the Regional Executive Bureau of IU-CM.

In October 2014 she announced her intention to seek the nomination of United Left for the Presidency of the Community of Madrid in the open primary that would be held in November that year. Sanchez co-campaigned in the election with Mauricio Valiente who sought the nomination for Mayor of Madrid. On the primary Election held in 30 November Tania Sanchez obtained a landslide victory in the Primary election over the candidate supported by the party leadership Jose Antonio Moreno and minority Candidate Julian Sanchez Vizcaino.

On 4 February 2015, after her disagreements with the management of the Madrid federation, she left the United Left, looking forward to founding a new party in Madrid.

She is a usual participant in several TV debates such as Al rojo vivo, La Tuerka, Dando caña and El gato al agua.

Notes

References

External links 
 Personal site

1979 births
Living people
Más Madrid politicians
Members of the 9th Assembly of Madrid
Members of the 11th Assembly of Madrid
Members of the 12th Congress of Deputies (Spain)
Members of the United Left–The Greens Parliamentary Group (Assembly of Madrid)
Podemos (Spanish political party) politicians
Politicians from Madrid
City councillors in the Community of Madrid
Rivas-Vaciamadrid
United Left (Spain) politicians
Women members of the Congress of Deputies (Spain)